Marias Pass (elevation ) is a mountain pass in the Rocky Mountains in the western US state of Montana.  Lying on the southern border of
Glacier National Park, it is traversed by US Highway 2 and by the BNSF Hi-Line Subdivision.
The pass is the lowest crossing of the Continental Divide between Canada and central New Mexico

, and is the northernmost pass in the US open to automobile traffic year-round.

Geography

Marias Pass traverses the Continental Divide in the Lewis Range, along the boundary between the Lewis and Clark National Forest and the Flathead National Forest. The pass forms the southern limit of the Continental Ranges, a major grouping of the Rocky Mountains which extends as far north as McGregor Pass in the Northern Rockies of the Canadian province of British Columbia. The Great Bear Wilderness in Lewis and Clark National Forest is south of the pass and Glacier National Park is to the north.

History

As a low pass through the Rocky Mountains, Marias Pass was undoubtedly known to Native Americans for countless years.  And while the pass was likely known by early fur trappers,

its potential for use beyond foot traffic wasn’t recognized until the middle of the nineteenth century.

Survey of 1853

In 1853 Congress approved funding to survey possible routes for a transcontinental railroad.  The project was known as the Pacific Railroad Survey, and Isaac Stevens (who had just been appointed as the first governor of Washington Territory) was chosen to lead the survey of the northernmost of the four candidate routes.  Stevens’ voluminous report of that survey, published six years after the expedition, provides detailed insights.  Of September 5, 1853, Stevens writes:

Mr. Lander was busily occupied to-day in fitting out his party for the survey of Marias Pass, in reference to which I also gained some general information that satisfied me of the existence of a pass in that quarter.  Since I have given my attention to the passes of these mountains, I have been greatly impressed with the fact, from the course of the streams and the general deportment of the country, that there must be a good and practicable pass leading from some branch of the Marias;  and at this time I was sanguine that we should find there the best solution of the question of the railroad practicability of the Rocky Mountain range.
Governor Stevens’ confident entry for September 5 (written years later) could have been colored by the events of a few days later:
From the Little Dog, a prominent chief of the Piegan tribe [of Blackfeet], and a man of character and probity, I got a very particular description of the Marias Pass we were in search of.  From some superstition of the Blackfeet, it has not been used for many years, but formerly it was almost the only thoroughfare made use of by the Indians in passing from one side of the mountains to the other.  It is a broad, wide open valley, with scarcely a hill or obstruction on the road, excepting here and there some fallen timber.

Undoubtedly feeling pressured by his duty to organize the newly-formed Washington Territory, Governor Stevens pressed on across the Rockies without locating Marias Pass. After crossing the Continental Divide at Cadotte Pass (elevation ), Stevens sent the civilian engineer Abiel Tinkham back to look for the pass.

Upon hearing Tinkham’s report, and realizing Tinkham’s error, the determined Isaac Stevens made one final attempt to locate the elusive pass, requesting survey party member James Doty, left behind at Fort Benton, attempt to find it from the east.  Stevens dutifully reported Doty’s not-quite-successful results in the Survey report:
Turning back on the 8th of June [1854], Mr. Doty retraced his route as far as the Marias, already referred to as issuing from a gap 15 miles wide, and along which was an old Indian trail, and followed it up on the trail for thirty miles to the southwest, finding no obstruction, except from trees;  and at that distance, ascending a lofty hill, saw no mountains in the direction of the stream.  On each side the mountains were lofty and rugged, showing, generally, perpendicular rock from within 300 feet of their summits, which were covered with snow;  and snow banks were also found on the north side of many hills.  It is to be regretted that Mr. Doty did not continue on, and ascertain where the trail issued on the western side of the mountains.

This is the true Marias Pass, described to me by the Little Dog at Fort Benton in September, 1853, and formerly used by the Indians in crossing the mountains.

News of such a pass, even unexplored, was too important to wait for publication.  Ever self-confident, Isaac Stevens must have spread word of Marias Pass by mouth:  in 1857, three years before publication of the Survey results, James G. Swan, early resident of Washington Territory, wrote in The Northwest Coast,
In 1853, Governor Isaac I. Stevens, the first Governor of the Territory, surveyed a route for a Northern Pacific Rail-road and discovered a pass near the sources of Maria’s River suitable for a rail-road, estimated to be 2500 feet lower than the south pass of Fremont.

By modern measurements, Marias Pass is  lower than the south pass of Fremont.

Survey of 1889

Marias Pass was finally explored and charted in December 1889 by John Frank Stevens, principal engineer of the Great Northern Railway (GN). The location of the pass had been rumored for decades beforehand, but it took Stevens and a Flathead guide named Coonsah, who had been hiding out with the Blackfoot in Browning, to discover it.

The pass proved ideal for a railroad, because its approach was broad and open, within a valley ranging from one to six miles wide, and at a gentle grade that would not require extensive excavation or rockwork. Construction of the railroad through the pass began on August 1, 1890, starting west from Fort Assinniboine toward Marias Pass. The railroad followed the Middle Fork of the Flathead River west of the Continental Divide.

Stevens also discovered the pass across the Cascades in central Washington which bears his name.

Roosevelt Memorial Obelisk
A memorial to President Theodore Roosevelt was constructed along the Continental Divide at the top of the pass. Construction began in 1930, with the original intent to produce a granite archway across the highway, and a cornerstone was placed to the southeast of the highway. Eleanor Roosevelt was later on hand to place a small copper box filled with a copy of the bill that appropriated funds for the memorial as well as some other documents into the cornerstone. It has a tapering cement core covered on all sides with  slabs of Montana granite quarried near Helena. It was later decided to build an obelisk instead of an archway; it was completed  in 1931.

Today, U.S. Route 2 uses the pass, along with the BNSF Railway, a successor to the Great Northern Railway. The railway line, which sees freight traffic, as well as Amtrak's Empire Builder, is part of BNSF's Northern Transcon line linking Chicago and the Pacific Northwest. A statue of Stevens stands at the summit of Marias Pass.

See also
 Mountain passes in Montana

References

Landforms of Glacier County, Montana
Rail mountain passes of the United States
Mountain passes of Montana
Rocky Mountains
Great Northern Railway (U.S.)
Lewis Range
U.S. Route 2